Kié-Ntem  is a province of Equatorial Guinea. Its capital is Ebebiyín.

Kié-Ntem borders the following country subdivisions:
South Region, Cameroon - north
Woleu-Ntem Province, Gabon - east
Wele-Nzas, Equatorial Guinea - south
Centro Sur, Equatorial Guinea - west

The province takes its name from the River Kié and Ntem River (Campo).

References

 
Provinces of Equatorial Guinea